The Canton of Monthureux-sur-Saône is a former French administrative and electoral grouping of communes in the Vosges département of eastern France and in the region of Lorraine. It was disbanded following the French canton reorganisation which came into effect in March 2015. It consisted of 11 communes, which joined the canton of Darney in 2015. It had 2,447 inhabitants (2012).

One of 13 cantons in the Arrondissement of Épinal, the Canton of Monthureux-sur-Saône had its administrative centre at Monthureux-sur-Saône.

Composition
The Canton of Monthureux-sur-Saône comprised the following 11 communes:

Ameuvelle
Bleurville
Claudon
Fignévelle
Gignéville
Godoncourt
Martinvelle
Monthureux-sur-Saône
Nonville
Regnévelle
Viviers-le-Gras

References

Monthureux-sur-Saone
2015 disestablishments in France
States and territories disestablished in 2015